Jaime Jaquez Jr. (born February 18, 2001) is a Mexican American college basketball player for the UCLA Bruins of the Pac-12 Conference. He was named a consensus second-team All-American and voted the Pac-12 Player of the Year as a senior in 2023. Jaquez has earned three All-Pac-12 selections, including first-team honors twice. He is also a two-time member of the Pac-12 All-Defensive Team.

Early life and high school career
Jaquez is the son of Angela and Jaime Jaquez Sr., who met while playing basketball at Concordia University. Jaime Jr. is the third generation of his family to have played college basketball; Jaime Sr.'s father, Ezequiel, who came to California with his family from Mexico as a child, played at Ventura Community College and Northern Arizona University.

Jaime Jr. was born in Irvine, California, and has a younger brother Marcos and younger sister Gabriela. Jaquez grew up in Camarillo and attended Camarillo High School. As a freshman, he averaged 15.3 points, 10.0 rebounds, 2.3 assists, and 2.6 steals per game and led the team to a 25–7 record and the California Interscholastic Federation (CIF) semifinals. As a sophomore, Jaquez earned all-Ventura County second-team honors, averaging 24.1 points, 10.9 rebounds, 2.2 assists, and 2.6 steals per game, despite missing 12 games with an ankle injury.

Jaquez averaged 31.7 points, 11.7 rebounds, 3.7 assists, and 2.1 steals per game as a senior and helped the team finish 25–4 and win its first Coastal Canyon League title. He earned first-team All-CIF Southern Section honors and finished his high school career with 2,653 points. Jaquez broke the school single-game scoring record with a 54-point outing against Royal High School. Jaquez was also a pitcher on the high school baseball team.

College career

At the University of California, Los Angeles, Jaquez became a starter for the Bruins during the Maui Jim Maui Invitational in November 2019. He scored 17 points and had 12 rebounds in a win against Chaminade on November 26. On December 1, he scored a season-high 18 points in a 93–64 win over San Jose State. He scored 18 points on February 27, 2020, and hit the game-winning three-pointer with 0.6 seconds remaining in a 75–72 win over Arizona State. As a freshman, Jaquez averaged 8.9 points and 4.8 rebounds per game. He was named honorable mention Pac-12 All-Freshman team.

On February 18, 2021, Jaquez scored 25 points on his 20th birthday in a 74–60 win over Arizona, the Bruins' fifth straight in its rivalry with the Wildcats. For the season, he was a second-team All-Pac-12 selection and was named to the Pac-12 All-Defensive Team. In UCLA's First Four play-in game of the 2021 NCAA tournament, he led the Bruins in scoring with a 27 points in a 86–80 overtime win against Michigan State.

In 2021–22, Jaquez was restricted by ankle injuries throughout most of the season. He suffered from synovitis in one ankle and began wearing braces on both ankles as a preventative measure. He bounced back from a three-game stretch in mid-February 2022 in which he scored a combined 13 points. On February 28, Jaquez scored a career-high 30 points in a 77–66 win over Washington. In the following game, he scored 27 points in the regular-season finale against USC, helping UCLA end its five-game losing streak in their crosstown rivalry with the Trojans. He was named the Pac-12 Player of the Week after averaging 28.5 points on 64 percent shooting along with 7.5 rebounds, as the Bruins clinched the No. 2 seed in the Pac-12 tournament. Jaquez was named to the All-Pac-12 first team and was voted again to the conference's defensive team. He was one of five finalists for the Julius Erving Award, given to the top small forward in the country. In the second round of the 2022 NCAA tournament, he scored 15 points in a 72–56 win over Saint Mary's, but exited the game and did not return after spraining his right ankle with seven minutes remaining in the second half. He was averaging 20.5 points in his last eight games, with the Bruins going 7–1. The stretch coincided with his being able to resume practicing, while UCLA's leading scorer, Johnny Juzang, was in a scoring slump. Jaquez recovered to play 38 minutes in the following game against North Carolina in the Sweet Sixteen, but the Bruins lost 73–66. He scored 10 points, shooting 1-for-11 in the second half and missing his final nine shots.

Jaquez returned to UCLA for his senior year in 2022–23. For the second straight season, he was named to a finalist for the Julius Erving Award. On February 4, 2023, he had a game-high 24 points and a career-high 15 rebounds in a 76–52 win over Washington State. That month, he scored late baskets in multiple games to help lead the team to victories, including seven points in  minutes as the Bruins secured a win over Utah. He led UCLA to their first Pac-12 regular season title since 2013. Jaquez was named a consensus second-team All-American. He was voted the Pac-12 Player of the Year, becoming the first Bruin to win since Kevin Love in 2008 and the first UCLA senior to capture the award since Ed O'Bannon in 1995. Jacquez also earned his second consecutive first-team all-conference selection. The Bruins received a No. 2 seed in the 2023 NCAA tournament. In the opener, Jacquez had 17 points, eight rebounds, and a career-high five steals in a 86–53 rout over No. 15-seed UNC Asheville.

National team career
Jaquez played for the Mexico national team in the 2019 Pan American Games in Lima, Peru.

Career statistics

College

|-
| style="text-align:left;"| 2019–20
| style="text-align:left;"| UCLA
| 31 || 23 || 26.6 || .454 || .313 || .761 || 4.8 || 1.4 || 1.4 || .4 || 8.9
|-
| style="text-align:left;"| 2020–21
| style="text-align:left;"| UCLA
| 32 || 32 || 34.9 || .486 || .394 || .655 || 6.1 || 1.7 || 1.2 || .7 || 12.3
|-
| style="text-align:left;"| 2021–22
| style="text-align:left;"| UCLA
| 34 || 34 || 30.5 || .472 || .276 || .761 || 5.7 || 2.3 || 1.1 || .3 || 13.9
|-class="sortbottom"
| style="text-align:center;" colspan=2| Career
| 97 || 85 || 30.7 || .472 || .332 || .723 || 5.5 || 1.8 || 1.2 || .5 || 11.8

Source:

Personal life
Jaquez's sister Gabriela, who shared MVP honors at the 2022 McDonald's All-American Girls Game, committed to joining the UCLA women's basketball team as part of its 2022–23 freshman class. His brother Marcos became a defensive lineman for Camarillo High's football team.

References

External links

UCLA Bruins bio
USA Basketball bio

2001 births
Living people
All-American college men's basketball players
American men's basketball players
American sportspeople of Mexican descent
Basketball players at the 2019 Pan American Games
Basketball players from California
Mexican men's basketball players
People from Camarillo, California
Shooting guards
Small forwards
UCLA Bruins men's basketball players